Hakuba Ski Jumping Stadium is a ski jumping hill in Hakuba, Japan. It hosted the ski jumping and the ski jumping part of the Nordic combined events at the 1998 Winter Olympics. The stadium holds a maximum of 45,000 spectators, and was built in 1992.

References

1998 Winter Olympics official report. Volume 2. pp. 203–5.
Stadium information
1998 Olympics information

Sports venues completed in 1992
Venues of the 1998 Winter Olympics
Ski jumping venues in Japan
Olympic Nordic combined venues
Olympic ski jumping venues
1992 establishments in Japan
Sports venues in Nagano Prefecture
Hakuba, Nagano